Roche ("roach"; , meaning homestead of the rock) is a civil parish and village in mid-Cornwall, United Kingdom. Roche is the Norman-French word for Rock. The parish population at the 2011 census including Belowda, Bilberry, Carbis, Coldvreath and Criggan is 3,381, and the ward population at the same census was 3,867.

Nearby are the towns of Bodmin and St Austell, as well as the Eden Project. The civil servant Charles Knight was born in Roche and Liberal Democrat Member of Parliament Matthew Taylor retired there.

Roche Rock

The rock is of interest to geologists as it is a fine example of quartz schorl; a fully tourmalinised granite, with black tourmaline crystals. The presence of numerous pegmatites occurring as sheets and containing abundant miarolitic cavities carrying quartz, tourmaline, zinnwaldite, topaz. and a wide range of other phases, is why the present outcrop of the St Austell granite is considered to have been close to the roof of the intrusion. One such pegmatite was formerly exploited for orthoclase feldspar at Tresayes Quarry, on the southern edge of the village and now a geological nature reserve of Cornwall Wildlife Trust. Part of this quarry also exploited quartz-tourmaline rock for aggregate. Roche Rock is considered to be of prime importance for future research and notification by English Nature as a geological SSSI occurred in 1991.

On top of Roche Rock is a ruined chapel (dedicated to St Michael) which is said to have been the abode of a leper or a monk. An 1881 description of the chapel, still had a considerable portion of the masonry standing and one or two windows were fairly perfect, although the steps up to the chapel are roughly cut. Roche Rock has many folk-lore tales associated with it, the two most famous being the legend of Jan Tregeagle, a 17th-century magistrate, who after death found refuge in the chapel and the other being part of the Tristan and Iseult tale.

Parish church

The church is dedicated to St Gomondas / Gonandus (Gonand or Goenandus): the tower is medieval but the rest of the church was rebuilt in 1822. There is a fine Norman font and a good churchyard cross. Gonandus may perhaps be identified with the Breton saint Conan, connected to three places in the diocese of Vannes.

There are two Cornish crosses in the parish: one in a meadow near the rectory garden is thought to be in situ; the other in the churchyard has ornament on the four sides of the shaft. The churchyard cross is made of a massive piece of moorland granite; it has similarities to the cross in the graveyard at Merther Uny. Glebe Cross has crosses in relief on either face of the cross head.

Railway
Roche railway station is located approximately 1 mile north of Roche, at Victoria on the Atlantic Coast Line. Trains are operated by Great Western Railway. The station has a single track, with a marker board showing direction of travel either to Newquay or Par.

Business 
The Victoria Business Park on the outskirts of Roche is an attractively landscaped estate consisting of 28 modern units. The units are designed for light industrial, warehouse and trade uses. Most of the units have a secure gated yard.

References

Bibliography
 Payne, H. M. Creswell (1948) Story of the Parish of Roche, ASIN: B004ITZBWG

External links

 Notes and photos of Roche Rock from The Modern Antiquarian
 Cornwall Record Office Online Catalogue for Roche

Villages in Cornwall
Civil parishes in Cornwall
Sites of Special Scientific Interest in Cornwall